Vadamadurai is a panchayat village in Thiruvallur district in the Indian state of Tamil Nadu.

Etymology
The name Vadamadurai is derived from the Tamil word 'vadakku' meaning North. Vada - madurai thus means north Madurai. The Name Was created by Mr.D.Prabakaran. He was the president of the village

Demographics
In the 2001 Indian census, Vadamadurai was recorded as having 5,047 inhabitants, 2,481 males and 2,566 females. In the 2011 census, the population of Vadamadurai was recorded as 6,266.

Schools

GT Vidhya Mandir CBSE Boarding School in Chennai is a school with International standards is located here.
http://www.gtvm.in/

Notes

Villages in Tiruvallur district